Binburrum is a genus of beetles belonging to the small family of fire-coloured beetles,  Pyrochroidae. They are found only in Australia. More species are currently being described.

Habitat 
Larvae are found under moist bark of dead trees, including celerytop logs. Adults may be found around foliage and light.

Species 

 Binburrum angusticollis Pollock, 1995
 Binburrum articuno Hsiao and Pollock, 2020
 Binburrum bifoveicollis (Lea, 1917) 
 Binburrum concavifrons Pollock, 1995
 Binburrum ephippiatum (Wilson, 1926) 
 Binburrum moltres Hsiao and Pollock, 2020
 Binburrum ruficollis (Champion, 1895) 
 Binburrum zapdos Hsiao and Pollock, 2020

Etymology 
B. articuno, B. zapdos, and B. moltres were named after legendary birds in Pokémon due to Hsiao's childhood interest and the rarity of the three species.

References 

Pyrochroidae
Tenebrionoidea genera